Michael Keränen (born 4 January 1990) is a Finnish professional ice hockey forward who is currently playing with Bietigheim Steelers in the Deutsche Eishockey Liga (DEL).

Playing career
Undrafted, Keränen first played as a youth in his native Finland with Tappara before moving to Ilves as a 17-year-old. Keränen made his professional debut in the SM-liiga with Ilves at the conclusion of the 2009–10 season. After his fifth season with Ilves, in which he led the team in scoring with 52 points in as many games, Keränen initially signed as a free agent on a one-year contract with rival Finnish Liiga club, HIFK on 30 April 2014.

A little over a month later, Keränen exercised his NHL out clause to leave HIFK and sign his first NHL contract on a one-year, two-way deal with the Minnesota Wild on 5 June 2014.

In the following 2015–16 season, Keränen returned to the Iowa Wild for a second season. He was leading Iowa in goals when on 17 November 2015, he received his first recall to the Wild. Making his NHL debut later that night against the Pittsburgh Penguins. He was promptly returned to the AHL and on 29 February 2016, he was dealt by the Minnesota Wild, executing a minor league trade deadline deal, to the Ottawa Senators in return for defenseman Conor Allen.

On 28 April 2016, Keränen ended his North American tenure in agreeing to return to Finland in signing a two-year contract with Jokerit of the KHL. Keränen and Jokerit parted ways by mutual consent in late November 2016. He had appeared in 25 KHL contests for the club, with two goals and five assists. On 6 December 2016, he returned to Ilves, where he once had made his Liiga debut.

Near the end of the 2017-18 season, with 5 games remaining in the regular season with KooKoo, Keränen -who was their leading scorer despite having missed 20 games- decided to leave the team with no playoffs hopes and joined Genève-Servette HC of the National League on a one-year contract worth CHF 700,000 for the remainder of the season to help Geneva make a playoff push. Keranen was paid CHF 175,000 of this contract. He eventually appeared in three games with Geneva, scoring one goal and left the team in the summer to join Mora IK of the Swedish Hockey League.

On 3 September 2019, Keränen returned to Switzerland in the second division, to play for EHC Visp of the Swiss League. He was brought in to replace injured Mark Van Guilder and Troy Josephs.

Career statistics

Awards and honours

References

External links
 

1990 births
SC Bietigheim-Bissingen players
Binghamton Senators players
Finnish ice hockey forwards
Genève-Servette HC players
HIFK (ice hockey) players
Iowa Wild players
Ilves players
Jokerit players
KooKoo players
Living people
Minnesota Wild players
Mora IK players
Ice hockey people from Stockholm
Undrafted National Hockey League players
Vaasan Sport players
EHC Visp players